European route E 851 is a road part of the International E-road network. It begins in Petrovac, Montenegro, passes through northern Albania and ends in Pristina, Kosovo.

Route 
 
  Petrovac (Start of Concurrency with ) - Sutomore (End of Concurrency with ) - Sukobin
 
 A1 Lezhë
 
 R7 Prizren
  Prishtina

External links 
 UN Economic Commission for Europe: Overall Map of E-road Network (2007)
 International E-road network

899851
E851
E851
E851